Peripatoides is a genus of velvet worms in the family Peripatopsidae, whose species are found in New Zealand. Like all velvet worms, these animals are nocturnal hunters that spit glue to trap their prey. Species of Peripatoides have 14, 15 or 16 pairs of legs. This genus exhibits lecithotrophic ovoviviparity; that is, mothers in this genus produce and retain yolky eggs in their uteri. The eggs are fertilized internally, and babies develop inside their mother until large enough to be born, in batches of 4-6, as colourless miniatures of the parents. These live-bearing Peripatoides have dermal-haemocoelic sperm transfer - which means sperm dissolve holes in the skin of the female to enter the body (haemolymph) anywhere on the body wall of the female.

Species 
The genus contains the following species:

 Peripatoides indigo Ruhberg, 1985
 Peripatoides kawekaensis Trewick, 1998
 Peripatoides suteri Dendy, 1894

The taxon with 15 pairs of legs from New Zealand, Peripatoides novaezealandiae (Hutton 1876), is a species complex of at least five reproductively isolated taxa described in 1998. These new species (Peripatoides aurorbis, Peripatoides kawekaensis, Peripatoides morgani and Peripatoides sympatrica Trewick, 1998) have no morphological characters that distinguish them although they are genetically differentiated. Peripatoides novaezealandiae (Hutton, 1876), and the cryptic species were considered nomina dubia by Oliveira et al., 2012 because type locations were identified not holotype specimens for P. novaezealandiae. However, the type material of the cryptic species are held at Te Papa Tongarewa Museum, eg. There is debate about whether a species name should be recognized if a whole dead specimen is not held in a museum.

In 2014 the New Zealand Department of Conservation also recognized:

 Peripatoides novaezealandiae (Hutton, 1876)
 Peripatoides aurorbis Trewick, 1998
 Peripatoides morgani  Trewick, 1998
 Peripatoides sympatrica Trewick, 1998

References

Further reading 
 New Zealand Department of Conservation (2014) New Zealand peripatus/ngaokeoke: Current knowledge, conservation and future research needs. Dunedin: Department of Conservation. 
 
 

Onychophorans of Australasia
Onychophoran genera
Taxa named by R. I. Pocock
Taxonomy articles created by Polbot